James Stevenson (July 11, 1929 – February 17, 2017) was an American illustrator and author of over 100 children's books.  His cartoons appeared regularly in The New Yorker magazine. He usually used a unique comic book style of illustration that is very recognizable.  His books, like What's Under My Bed, have been featured on the Reading Rainbow television series.

Biography

James Stevenson was born in New York City and educated at Yale University, where he was the feature editor of campus humor magazine The Yale Record.

He contributed his first cartoon to The New Yorker on March 10, 1956.

James Stevenson wrote and illustrated his first book Walker, the Witch, and the Striped Flying Saucer in 1969. He had previously illustrated the children's book If I Owned a Candy Factory (1968) written by his then eight-year-old son, James Walker Stevenson.

Awards

Could Be Worse! (1977) - was awarded the New York Times' "Outstanding Children's Book of the Year", and School Library Journal's "Best Books for Spring"
The Sea View Hotel (1978) - ALA Notable Book
Monty (1979) - School Library Journal's "Best Books for Spring"
Fast Friends: Two Stories (1979) - ALA's Notable Book designation
The Worst Person in the World (1979) - Children's Choice Award (International Reading Association)
Howard (1980) - New York Times' "Best Illustrated Book" and New York Times' "Outstanding Book"
That Terrible Halloween Night (1980) - ALA's Notable Book designation and Children's Choice Award (International Reading Association)
The Wish Card Ran Out! (1981) - School Library Journal's Best Books of 1981
The Night after Christmas (1982) - Children's Choice Award (International Reading Association) and Boston Globe/Horn Book honor list
We Can't Sleep (1982) - Christopher Award
Oliver, Clarence, and Violet (1982) - Parents' Choice Award
What's Under My Bed? (1983) - Boston Globe/Horn Book's honor list, ALA's Notable Book designation, and School Library Journal's Best Books of 1983
Grandpa's Great City Tour: An Alphabet Book (1982) - Garden State Children's Book Award (New Jersey Library Association)Higher on the Door (1987) - Parents' Choice designation and Redbook awardGeorgia Music (1987) - Boston Globe/Horn Book honor listGranddaddy's Place (1987) - Parents' Choice Picture Book awardThe Supreme Souvenir Factory (1989) - Children's Choice Award (International Reading Association)Oh No, It's Waylon's Birthday! (1990) - Children's Choice Award (International Reading Association)Something Big Has Been Here (1992) - Kentucky Bluegrass AwardDon't You Know There's a War On? (1992) - Parents' Choice Picture Book award

Select bibliography

Children's booksWalker, the Witch, and the Striped Flying SaucerIf I Owned a Candy FactoryJust Around the CornerLost and Found New York: Oddballs, Heroes, Heartbreakers, Scoundrels, Thugs, Mayors, and MysteriesRolling RoseHere Comes Herb's Hurricane (1973)That's Exactly the Way It Wasn'tMontyNo Need for MontyHowardThe Most Amazing DinosaurClams Can't Sing (1980)A Village Full of Valentines (1995)The Castaway (2002)

Grandpa, Mary Ann and Louie series
A series of tales told by a grandfather character to his grandchildren. Usually containing outrageous and unbelievable tales:Could Be Worse! (1977)That Terrible Halloween Night (1980)We Can't Sleep (1982)The Great Big Especially Beautiful Easter Egg (1983)Grandpa's Great City Tour: An Alphabet Book (1982)What's Under My Bed? (1983)Worse Than Willy (1984)That Dreadful Day (1985)There's Nothing to Do (1986)No Friends (1986)Will You Please Feed Our Cat? (1987)We Hate Rain! (1988)Grandpa's Too-Good Garden (1989)Brrr (1991)That's Exactly the Way It Wasn't (1991)

Emma series
Featuring Emma, a good witch, and her nemeses Dolores and Lavinia:Yuck! (1984)Emma (1985)Fried Feathers for ThanksgivingHappy Valentine's Day, Emma! (1987)Un-Happy New Year, Emma!Emma at the Beach (1990)

The Worst series
Featuring a crotchety old man:The Worst Person in the World The Worst Person in the World at Crab BeachThe Worst Person's ChristmasWorse than the WorstThe Worst Goes SouthMr. Frimdimpny series
These books feature the alligator Mr. Frimdimpny who has rules about no laughing:Don't Make Me Laugh (1999)No Laughing, No Smiling, No Giggling (2004)

Mud Flat Friends seriesMud Flat SpringChristmas at Mud FlatMud Flat MysteryMud Flat April FoolFlying Feet: A Mud Flat StoryThe Mud Flat OlympicsYard SaleHeat Wave at Mud FlatAutobiographical and reminiscent picture book series
A series of books illustrated in a softer watercolor style:When I Was NineHigher on the Door (1987)JulyDon't You Know There's a War On?Fun No Fun (1994)I Had a Lot of Wishes (1995)I Meant to Tell You (1996)

Young Adult novelsThe Bones in the CliffThe Unprotected WitnessPoetry
Collections of James Stevenson's poetry, illustrated by himself.Candy CornPopcornCornflakesSweet CornCorn ChowderCorn-FedJust Around the CORNerCartoons collectionsSorry, Lady. This Beach Is Private! (1963)Let's Boogie! (1978)

NovelsDo Yourself a Favor, Kid (1962)The Summer Houses (1963)Sometimes, But Not Always (1967)Something Marvelous Is About to Happen (1971)Cool Jack and the Beanstalk (1976)Uptown Local, Downtown Express (1983)

Illustrations for other authors
 If I Owned a Candy Factory (1968) by James Walker Stevenson (James Stevenson's son)
 "Encyclopedia  Brown Saves the Day" by Donald J. Sobol 
 Tony's Hard Work Day (1972) by Alan Arkin
 Cully Cully and the Bear (1983) by Wilson Gage
 I Know a Lady (1984) by Charlotte Zolotow
 I Am Not Going to Get Up Today! (1987) by Dr. Seuss
 Percy and the Five Houses by Else Holmelund Minarik
 Loop the Loop (1992) by Barbara Dugan
 The Royal Nap (1995) by Charles C. Black
 Rocks in His Head (2001) by Carol Otis Hurst
 Happily Ever After (2001) by Anna Quindlen

Illustrations for Judy Blume
The following books by Judy Blume feature cover artwork and inner illustrations by James Stevenson:
 Soupy Saturdays with the Pain and the Great One (August 28, 2007) 
 Cool Zone! with the Pain and the Great One (May 13, 2008) 
 Going, Going, Gone! with the Pain and the Great One (August 12, 2008) 
 Friend or Fiend? with the Pain and the Great One (May 12, 2009) 

Illustrations for Janet Schulman
James Stevenson illustrated three of Janet Schulman's Jack the Bum series:
 Jack the Bum and the Halloween Handout (1977)
 Jack the Bum and the Haunted House (1977)
 Jack the Bum and the UFO (1978)

Illustrations for Helen V. Griffith
James Stevenson illustrated a few of Helen V. Griffith's books:
 Georgia Music (1986)

Helen V. Griffith's Grandaddy trilogy
All illustrated by James Stevenson:
 Grandaddy's Place (1987)
 Grandaddy and Janetta (1993)
 Grandaddy's Stars (1995)
 Grandaddy and Janetta Together: The Three Stories in One Book (2001) (anthology that collects the three previous Grandaddy books)

Illustrations for Jack Prelutsky
The following books of children's poetry by Jack Prelutsky are illustrated by James Stevenson:
 The Baby Ugs are Hatching (1982)
 The New Kid on the Block (1984)
 Something BIG Has Been Here (1990)
 A Pizza the Size of the Sun (1996)
 It's Raining Pigs and Noodles (2000)
 My Dog May Be a Genius'' (2008)

References

External links
Biography and bibliography at Answers.com (Gale Biographies of Children's Authors)
 

1929 births
2017 deaths
American cartoonists
American children's book illustrators
American children's writers
Artists from New York City
The New Yorker cartoonists
Yale University alumni